The HTC Inspire 4G is the first smartphone available on AT&T Mobility branded as "4G". It was first announced at CES in January 2011 and was released in February 2011. The Inspire 4G is a variant of the HTC Desire HD that was sold in Europe so the Inspire has the same design and similar specifications except that the Inspire supports AT&T's HSPA+ 4G network.

Hardware

The Inspire features a 1 GHz Qualcomm Snapdragon processor and an 8 MP camera and dual LED flash, in-camera editing, live picture effects, and a 720p camcorder to capture HD video. It has a 4.3-inch class (480×800) WVGA (16M Colors) TFT capacitive touchscreen covered by Gorilla Glass, a special crack and scratch resistant material made by Corning with multi-touch input support.

The HTC Inspire 4G has 768 MB RAM and 4 GB of internal flash memory data storage. There is also a single microSDHC slot, which can accept a microSDHC card with a capacity of up to 32 GB of data storage.

Software
The Inspire launched with Android 2.2.1 Froyo with the custom HTC Sense 2.0 skin as the user interface. The OS was later updated on 8 August 2011 to Android 2.3.3 with Sense 2.1 and again on 31 July 2012 to Android 2.3.5 with Sense 3.0.

In May 2011, AT&T issued an update allowing unknown sources to be installed, which allows users to sideload applications. On 25 July 2011 AT&T issued Android 2.3.3 Gingerbread, HTC Sense 2.1, and various fixes to the phone.

On 31 July 2012 HTC released software update 3.20.502.52 OTA. New features included: Android 2.3.5, HTC Sense 3.0, Task Manager, and AT&T Address Book. Fixes/Updates included: Call optimization improvements, improved security functionality, SMS/MMS contact display fix, background data use improvement, and slightly longer battery life. This was the last official update for the phone's operating system. In March 2013, AT&T issued a security update for various HTC and carrier applications used in the previous software update.

In the xda-developers forum, user software is available for the device with Android 4.4.4 via Cyanogenmod 11.

HSUPA issues

Original specs pointed out the existence of HSUPA to enhance the upload speeds under the 3G network, but as early adopters inquired about slow upload connections, AT&T replied that the Inspire 4G is not HSUPA capable. However, the Inspire 4G is fully capable of HSUPA, but it was disabled by AT&T for unknown reasons. By 30 April 2011 AT&T issued an over the air (OTA) update enabling HSUPA for the HTC Inspire 4G.

See also
HTC Thunderbolt

References

External links

Inspire
Android (operating system) devices
Discontinued smartphones